Fernando Fabián Ovelar Martínez (born 6 January 2004) is a Paraguayan professional footballer who plays as a forward for Liga MX club Pachuca. He is the youngest ever player to score in the Paraguayan Primera División, when he netted at only 14 years old.

Club career
Ovelar made his professional debut for Cerro Porteño in a 1–1 Paraguayan Primera División tie with 3 de Febrero on 28 October 2018. Ovelar scored his first professional goal the following week in the Paraguayan Superclásico against Club Olimpia on 4 November 2018. Ovelar is the youngest player to ever play in the Paraguayan Primera División, and also the youngest ever scorer in the league, at the age of 14 years, 9 months and 27 days.

International career
On 12 December 2018, Ovelar made his debut for Paraguay U17, scoring in a 1–0 victory against Mexico U17.

Personal life
Ovelar's grandfather, Gerónimo Ovelar, was also a professional footballer who played for Cerro Porteño and the Paraguay national football team in the 1970s and 1980s.

See also
 Players and Records in Paraguayan Football

References

External links
 

2004 births
Living people
Sportspeople from Asunción
Paraguayan footballers
Association football forwards
Cerro Porteño players
Paraguayan Primera División players